The 1999 Nigerian Senate election in Ekiti State was held on February 20, 1999, to elect members of the Nigerian Senate to represent Ekiti State. Joseph Olatunji Ajayi representing Ekiti North and Ayo Oni representing Ekiti Central won on the platform of Alliance for Democracy, while Gbenga Aluko representing Ekiti South won on the platform of the Peoples Democratic Party.

Overview

Summary

Results

Ekiti North 
The election was won by Joseph Olatunji Ajayi of the Alliance for Democracy.

Ekiti Central 
The election was won by Ayo Oni of the Alliance for Democracy.

Ekiti South 
The election was won by Gbenga Aluko of the Peoples Democratic Party.

References 

February 1999 events in Nigeria
Eki
Ekiti State Senate elections